The University of Massachusetts Amherst alumni number is around 243,628 worldwide, as 2014.

Academy Award winners
 William Monahan, for adapted screenplay, The Departed
 Buffy Sainte-Marie, for best song, "Up Where We Belong" from An Officer and a Gentleman

Emmy Award winners
 Ed Christie 1979, BFA, art director/designer for The Jim Henson Company and Sesame Street.
 Billy Taylor MA, PhD, musician, music educator.

Grammy Award winners
 Natalie Cole 1972, singer
 Yusef Lateef 1975, composer
 Billy Taylor MA, PhD, composer
 Brian Vibberts, audio engineer

Nobel Prize winners
 Russell Hulse 1972G, 1975 Ph.D.

Pulitzer Prize winners
 Herbert Bix 1960, historian
 Paul Harding 1992, author and musician
 Natasha Trethewey 1995, U.S. poet laureate

Royalty and nobility
 Yaduveer Wadiyar, 27th and present titular King of Mysore and head of the former ruling Wadiyar dynasty

Academia
 Janet Abu-Lughod, sociologist, known for contributions to world-systems theory
 Christy Anderson G, professor of Art and Architecture at University of Toronto
 Maximilian Auffhammer B.S. 1996, George Pardee Jr. Professor of International Sustainable Development, University of California, Berkeley
 Doris E. Abramson, professor and author.
 Dorothy Barresi, professor at California State University at Northridge
 Francis A. Bartlett 1905, eminent dendrologist
 Edwin Bergin 1995 Ph.D., professor of astronomy at the University of Michigan and recipient of the Dannie Heineman Prize for Astrophysics
 Janet Catherine Berlo 1974, art historian
 Ann Bermingham, art historian
 Michael Blakey, National Endowment for the Humanities Professor at the College of William & Mary
 Carlton Brown 1972, 1979G, president of Clark Atlanta University
 Lin Chao, professor at University of California, San Diego
 Vicente Cabrera Funes, professor and writer at University of Minnesota Morris
 Gennaro Chierchia, professor and Department Chair of Linguistics at Harvard University
 Philip R. Day G, former Chancellor of City College of San Francisco and Cape Cod Community College
 Michael Dirr, professor of horticulture at University of Georgia
 Evan Dobelle 19363, 1970G, 1987 Ed.D., president of Westfield State College
 Larry W. Esposito 1977G, planetary astronomer, professor at the Laboratory for Atmospheric and Space Physics, University of Colorado
 Vera King Farris G, former president of Richard Stockton College of New Jersey
 Bertram Forer 1936, psychologist, namesake of the Forer effect
 Michael J. Franklin, professor and chair of Computer Science, at University of Chicago
 Dennis Hanno, President of Wheaton College
 Mary Lou Heiss, historian and tea connoisseur
 David Helfand 1977 Ph.D., Professor of Chair of Astronomy at Columbia University
Sally Hirsh-Dickinson, New Hampshire Public Radio Producer and Host, Professor of English at Rivier University.
 Donald F. Hunt, University Professor of Chemistry and Pathology at University of Virginia
 Leonard Katz, professor of Psychology at University of Connecticut
 Joy Ladin, professor at Yeshiva University
 Paul J. LeBlanc, president of Southern New Hampshire University; former president of Marlboro College
 Guy Livingston, food scientist and founder of Phi Tau Sigma
 Dominic W. Massaro, professor of Psychology and Computer Engineering at the UC Santa Cruz
 Kembrew McLeod, Professor of Communication Studies at University of Iowa
 Li Minqi, Associate Professor of Economics at University of Utah
 Dana Mohler-Faria, president of Bridgewater State College
 Joseph B. Moore, president of Lesley University
 Ann C. Noble, professor at UC Davis
 Steven Nock, Commonwealth Professor of Sociology at the University of Virginia
 William Oakland, former Professor of Economics at Tulane University
 Christopher Ober, Ph.D. 1982, Francis Norwood Bard Professor of Materials Engineering at Cornell University
 Alexey A Petrov, 1997, Professor of Physics at Wayne State University, recipient of the National Science Foundation CAREER Award
 Carl Phillips, Professor of English and of African and Afro-American Studies at Washington University in St. Louis
 David Rosner, professor at Columbia University
 Minouche Shafik, 1983, Director of the London School of Economics
 Lawrence Solan 1978 Ph.D., professor of law at Brooklyn Law School
 Winthrop E. Stone 1882, former President of Purdue University
 Roger Stritmatter 2001 PhD, professor of humanities; a leading modern-day advocate of the Oxfordian theory of Shakespeare authorship
 Edwin Lorimer Thomas 1963 B.S., Ernest Dell Butcher Professor of Engineering at Rice University
 David A. Tirrell 1978 Ph.D., provost at California Institute of Technology
 Matthew Tirrell 1977 Ph.D., founding dean of Pritzker School of Molecular Engineering at the University of Chicago
 Albert E. Waugh 1924 B.S., professor of economics and provost at the University of Connecticut
 Laura Wright - founder of academic field of Vegan studies
 Müjde Yüksel, assistant professor at Suffolk University
 Edward N. Zalta, Principal Editor of the Stanford Encyclopedia of Philosophy
 Zhi-Li Zhang, Distinguished University Professor of Computer Science at University of Minnesota
 Zhou Qifeng 1983 Ph.D., former President of Peking University
 Jonathan Wilker, Professor of Chemistry at Purdue University
 Donald P. Zingale 1969G, president of the State University of New York at Cobleskill

Science and technology
 William P. Brooks 1875, agronomist, foreign advisor to the Japanese government in the Meiji period, president of the Massachusetts Agricultural College
 Catherine Coleman 1991, Ph.D., astronaut
Fernanda Ferreira 1985 MS Psychology;1986, MA Linguistics; 1988 PhD Psychology, Cognitive Psychologist, Professor at University of California, Davis
 Rebecca Hasson, Associate Professor at University of Michigan
 Devang Vipin Khakhar, chemical engineer, academic, Shanti Swarup Bhatnagar laureate
 Doina Precup senior fellow at the Canadian Institute for Advanced Research
 Dan Riccio, 1986, Senior Vice President of Hardware Engineering at Apple
 Cynthia E. Rosenzweig, Senior Research Scientist at NASA Goddard Institute for Space Studies
 Dorion Sagan 1981, author
 Steven Sinofsky 1989, president of Windows Division at Microsoft
 Sarah Stewart, first woman to be awarded an MD Degree from Georgetown University School of Medicine
 Jim Waldo 1980, lead software architect on Jini, CTO of Harvard University
Rachel Whitmer, 1995, epidemiologist and Alzheimer's researcher
Sandra Leal, 2013, pharmacist and president of the American Pharmacists Association

Business 
 Betsy Atkins, 3-time CEO and serial entrepreneur and founder of Baja Corporation
 Tony Barbee (1993), collegiate basketball coach at Kentucky Wildcats men's basketball
 Bruce Berkowitz 1980, Managing director and Morningstar Domestic-Stock Fund Manager of the Decade (2010) of Fairholme Funds
 J. B. Bernstein, CEO of Access Group and chief marketing officer (CMO) of Seven Figures Management
 Wayne Chang, director of product strategy at Twitter
 Ben Cherington (1997), former executive vice president and general manager of the Boston Red Sox
 Douglas Cliggott 1978, former managing director and chief investment strategist of JPMorgan Chase & Co.
 Chris Daggett, president and CEO of the Geraldine R. Dodge Foundation
 Marc Forgione, owner of restaurant Marc Forgione in New York City
 Arturo Guevara, baseball writer
 Neal Huntington (1992), general manager of the Pittsburgh Pirates
 Anshu Jain (1985), president of Cantor Fitzgerald and former global co-CEO of Deutsche Bank
 Dave Jauss, professional baseball coach
 John Legere, former CEO and president of T-Mobile US
 Dave Littlefield (1984), senior vice president and general manager of the Pittsburgh Pirates
 Agenor Mafra-Neto, CEO of ISCA Technologies
 Lawrence Mestel (born 1962), music executive and CEO of Primary Wave.
 James Pallotta (1979), president of A.S. Roma and chairman and managing director of Raptor Group
 Vivek Paul, former CEO of Wipro Technologies
 Gil Penchina, CEO of Wikia, Inc.
 Rudolf Rodríguez, former Minister of Finance and Public Credit of Colombia
 John F. Smith, Jr. (1960), former CEO and Chairman of General Motors Corporation
 Earl W. Stafford, founder of the Stafford Foundation
 Mike Tannenbaum (1991), former general manager of the New York Jets
 Jeff Taylor 2001, founder of Monster.com
 Jack Welch 1957, retired CEO of General Electric
 Jill Whalen, CEO of High Rankings; co-founder of Search Engine Marketing New England
 Nick Zhang, CEO of Wuzhen Institute
 Pat Walsh, Co-founder and Chief Impact Officer of Classy

Law and politics

Governors
 Madeleine Kunin 1956, first female Governor of Vermont and former United States Ambassador to Switzerland (1985–1991)

Congressmen
 Peter G. Torkildsen 1980, former member of the United States House of Representatives from Massachusetts (1993–1997)

U.S. government officials
 Kenneth S. Apfel 1970, former Commissioner of Social Security (1997–2001)
 Richard A. Baker, Historian of the United States Senate
 Charles B. Curtis 1962, former Chairman of the Federal Energy Regulatory Commission (1977–1981); acting United States Secretary of Energy (1997)
 Chris Daggett 1977 Ed.D, Regional United States Environmental Protection Agency Administrator, 2009 New Jersey gubernatorial candidate
 Kenneth Feinberg 1967, Obama Administration "Compensation Czar" and former Special Master of the U.S. Government's September 11th Victim Compensation Fund
 James Kallstrom 1966, former assistant director of the FBI
 Jack Ward Thomas 1972 Ph.D, former Chief of the United States Forest Service (1993–1996)

Diplomats
 Jeffrey Davidow 1965, former United States Ambassador to Zambia, Venezuela, and Mexico; named a Career Ambassador in 2002
 Thomas C. Krajeski, former United States Ambassador to Yemen
 Madeleine Kunin 1956, former United States Ambassador to Switzerland and first female Governor of Vermont
 Stephen A. Seche, United States Ambassador to Yemen since 2007

Jurists
 Marsha Kazarosian, 1978, attorney who handled high-profile cases
 David A. Lowy, Judge of the Massachusetts Supreme Judicial Court
 Fred I. Parker 1962, served as a federal judge on the United States Court of Appeals for the Second Circuit
 Eduardo C. Robreno 1967 MA, federal judge on the United States District Court for the Eastern District of Pennsylvania
Erik P. Kimball 1987 BA, federal judge on the United States Bankruptcy Court Southern District of Florida

State legislators and executives
 Denise Andrews, member of the Massachusetts House of Representatives (2011–present)
 David M. Bartley 1956, former Speaker of the Massachusetts House of Representatives (1969–1973) and 1984 candidate for the United States Senate
 Joan Bray, former member of Missouri State Senate (2003–2010) and Missouri House of Representatives (1993–2002)
 Stephen Brewer 1971, member of the Massachusetts State Senate (1995–present)
 Linda Dean Campbell member of the Massachusetts House of Representatives (2007–present)
 Reuven Carlyle 1987, member of the Washington House of Representatives (2009–present)
 Steven D'Amico, former member of the Massachusetts House of Representatives (2007–2011)
 Eileen Donoghue 1976, member of the Massachusetts State Senate (2011–present)
 Lewis G. Evangelidis 1984, member of the Massachusetts House of Representatives (2003–present)
 Christopher M. Fierro 2002, 2004 MS, former member of the Rhode Island House of Representatives (2009–2011)
 John J. Finnegan, former Massachusetts State Auditor (1981–1987)
 Nancy Flavin 1986, former member of the Massachusetts House of Representatives (1993–2003)
 Paul K. Frost 1993, member of the Massachusetts House of Representatives (1997 to present), Asst. House Minority Whip
 Thomas N. George, former member of the Massachusetts House of Representatives (1997–2005)
 Guy Glodis, former member of the Massachusetts State Senate (1999–2005) and Massachusetts House of Representatives (1997–1999)
 Frederick D. Griggs 1913, former member of the Massachusetts House of Representatives (1925–1928)
 Christopher Hodgkins, former member of the Massachusetts House of Representatives (1983–2003)
 Kate Hogan, member of the Massachusetts House of Representatives (2009–present)
 Philip W. Johnston, former Massachusetts Secretary of Human Services
 Sally Kerans 1982, former member of the Massachusetts House of Representatives (1991–1997)
 Stephen Kulik, member of the Massachusetts House of Representatives (1993–present)
 Patrick Landers, former member of the Massachusetts House of Representatives (1987–1999)
 Gary LeBeau, member of the Connecticut State Senate (1997–present)
 Paul Mark, member of the Massachusetts House of Representatives (2011–present)
 Michael W. Morrissey, District Attorney of Norfolk County, Massachusetts (2011–present)
 Betty Jo Nelsen, former member of the Wisconsin State Assembly (1979–1990)
 Arthur D. Norcross 1871, former member of the Massachusetts State Senate (1908–1909) and Massachusetts House of Representatives (1904–1906)
 Andrea F. Nuciforo, Jr. 1986, former member of the Massachusetts State Senate (1997–2007)
 Carmen Hooker Odom, former secretary of the North Carolina Department of Health and Human Services
 David Poisson, former member of the Virginia House of Delegates (2006–2010)
 Ruth Provost, former member of the Massachusetts House of Representatives (1997–2003)
 Stanley C. Rosenberg 1977, openly gay member of the Massachusetts State Senate (1986–present)
 Marie St. Fleur, former member of the Massachusetts House of Representatives (1999–2011)
 Barry Trahan, former member of the Massachusetts House of Representatives (1987–1989)
 Joseph Wagner, former member of the Massachusetts House of Representatives (1991–present)
 Rachel Weston 2003, member of the Vermont House of Representatives (2007–present)

International figures
 Hau Lung-pin, 1982 Ph.D, Mayor of Taipei, Republic of China (Taiwan)
 Kang Kyung-wha MA, Ph.D., Foreign Minister of South Korea, former United Nations Deputy High Commissioner for Human Rights
 Hina Rabbani Khar 2001, Pakistani Minister of Foreign Affairs (2011–2013), the first female to hold this post
 Makaziwe Mandela, daughter of Nelson Mandela 
 Nemat Shafik, director of the London School of Economics; former Deputy Governor of the Bank of England; Recipient of Dame Commander of the Order of the British Empire
 Mose Penaani Tjitendero 1977 Ed.D., former Speaker of the National Assembly of Namibia
 Uttama Savanayana (อุตตม สาวนายน), 1990 Ph.D., Minister of Finance, Kingdom of Thailand

County and municipal officials
 Bonnie Dumanis (attended), District Attorney of San Diego County (2003–present)
 Maura Hennigan 1972, former Boston City Councilor and first female Clerk-Magistrate of Suffolk County
 Billy Kenoi 1993, Mayor of Hawaii County
 Salvatore LaMattina 1981, District 1 Boston City Councilor
 Joseph Sullivan, mayor of Braintree, Massachusetts

Activists
 Brian Darling 1987, conservative activist and senior fellow at The Heritage Foundation
 Chris Johnson, labor activist
 Jackson Katz, social activist
 Hugh Loebner, social activist for the decriminalization of prostitution
 Ray Rogers, labor rights activist and labor union strategist
 Tony Rudy, lobbyist and associate of Jack Abramoff
 Allen St. Pierre 1989, Executive Director of NORML
 Betty Shabazz 1975 PhD, widow of Malcolm X
 Sue Thrasher 1996 Ed.D, civil rights activist

Military
 Frederick Heyliger 1950, officer with Easy Company, 2nd Battalion, 506th Parachute Infantry Regiment, in the 101st Airborne Division of the United States Army during World War II; featured in the HBO miniseries Band of Brothers
 Andrew P. Iosue 1951 - General (R) of the United States Air Force; Commander of Air Training Command (COMATC), 1983–1986
 Jody Daniels, 34th Chief of Army Reserve
 Robert Miller, 24th Surgeon General of the United States Air Force and the United States Space Force
 L. Fletcher Prouty, Chief of Special Operations for the Joint Chiefs of Staff
 Brian Beaudreault, Commander of II Marine Expeditionary Force
 Franklin M. Davis Jr.,  Major General in the United States Army
 Thomas F. Healy,  U.S. Army general and former commandant of the Army War College
 William N. Sullivan

Film
 Jere Burns, 1980, actor
 Rob Corddry, actor
 Jeffrey Donovan, actor
 Richard Gere, 1971, actor (did not graduate)
 Jonathan Hensleigh, 1981, screenwriter and film director
 Fardeen Khan, Bollywood actor (did not graduate)
 Bridget Moynahan, actress (did not graduate)
 William Monahan, screenwriter, The Departed
 Bill Pullman, 1980 MFA, actor
Jason Nash, 1995, actor, director, screenwriter, comedian, YouTube personality

Television
 Norm Abram 1972, "America's most famous carpenter"
 Rob Corddry 1993, former writer and correspondent for The Daily Show, actor on television series The Winner
 Bill Cosby 1972G, 1976 Ed.D., actor, comedian, writer, star of The Cosby Show
 Jeff Corwin 2002, Animal Planet's The Jeff Corwin Experience
 Jeffrey Donovan 1991, star of USA original series Burn Notice
 Marc Forgione 2010, competitor on Food Network's Iron Chef America; won season three of "The Next Iron Chef" in 2010; owner of restaurant Marc Forgione in New York City
 Lauren Koslow, actress on Days of Our Lives
 Phil Laak, professional poker player nicknamed "The Unabomber"
 Loretta Long 1973 Ph.D., long-time Sesame Street actress
 Ken Ober 1980, game show host, comedian, and actor
 Nancy Oliver, writer for the series Six Feet Under
 Mark Preston 1994, CNN Senior Political Analyst and Executive Editor, CNN Politics
 Peter Tolan, television producer, director, and screenwriter
 Mark Wilding 1979, lead writer and executive producer of Grey's Anatomy
 Jean Worthley 1948, naturalist; former host of Hodgepodge Lodge; co-host of On Nature's Trail

Journalism
 Deepak Ananthapadmanabha 2006, web-based technology journalist
 Steve Buckley 1978, sportswriter
 Gerry Callahan, sports writer for the Boston Herald and radio talk show personality for WEEI
 Jill Carroll 1999, journalist for Christian Science Monitor, kidnapped in Iraq on assignment in January 2006
 Gail Collins 1970 MA, New York Times columnist and former editorial page editor
 Audie Cornish 2001, National Public Radio host of All Things Considered, former host of Weekend Edition Sunday
 Jenny Dell 2008, reporter for CBS Sports
 James Foley 2003, freelance journalist and photojournalist of the Syrian Civil War
 Matt Malone, 1994, Jesuit and journalist; editor in chief of America magazine 
 Michael C. Moynihan, senior editor of the libertarian magazine Reason
 Wendi Nix, reporter for ESPN
 David Pakman, host of the internationally syndicated television and radio program The David Pakman Show
 Mark Preston, Executive Editor, CNN Politics and CNN Senior Political Analyst
 Carol Rosenberg, senior journalist with the McClatchy News Service known for her coverage of the operation of the Guantanamo Bay detention camps in Cuba
 Dan Wetzel, national columnist, Yahoo! Sports; Netflix executive producer, New York Times best-selling author

History, literature, art, and music
 Kenny Aronoff 1975, drummer
 Alison Aune, artist
 Phillip Barron, poet and philosopher
 David Berman, poet, musician
 Frank Black, rock singer and guitarist in the Pixies
 Kathryn Burak, novelist 
 Vicente Cabrera Funes 1944, writer
 Jack Canfield 1972G, best-selling author
 Gordon Chandler 1975G, sculptor
 Constance Congdon 1982, M.F.A., playwright
 Bill Cosby 1972G, 1976 Ed.D., actor, comedian, writer
 Patrick DeCoste 2000, guitarist, composer
 Stephanie Deshpande 1997, painter
 Jason Donati, animator and artist
 Sadie Dupuis, singer and guitarist for Speedy Ortiz
 Harvey Goldman, artist, educator 
 Dana Gould 1986, comedian
 James Grinwis, poet
 Peter Hargitai, award-winning novelist, poet and translator
 Airline Inthyrath 2006, drag queen known as Jujubee, performer, TV personality
 Raymond Kennedy, novelist
 Fardeen Khan, Bollywood actor
 Beth Krommes 1980G, children's book illustrator
 Peter Laird, co-creator of Teenage Mutant Ninja Turtles
 Taj Mahal 1963, composer and singer
 William Manchester 1946, author, biographer, and recipient of the National Humanities Medal
 Valerie Martin 1974, novelist
 J Mascis, rock singer and guitarist in Dinosaur Jr
 Matthew Minicucci, poet
 Jeff Penalty (b. Jeff Alulis), former lead singer of Dead Kennedys
 Joe Pernice, singer in Pernice Brothers, Scud Mountain Boys, Chappaquiddick Skyline
 Terri Priest, artist
 Jesse Richards, Stuckist painter, filmmaker, Remodernist film
 Louis Ross 1917, architect, designed many of the campus buildings
 Larry Ruttman 1952, author and attorney
 Buffy Sainte-Marie 1970, singer
 Joey Santiago, guitarist in the Pixies
 Flo Steinberg, of Marvel Comics
 Susan Straight 1984, writer, novelist, professor at the University of California, Riverside
 Paul Theroux 1963, travel writer and author
 Natasha Trethewey 1995, U.S. poet laureate
 Jane Yolen, author
 Matthew Zapruder, poet

Athletics

Baseball
 Ben Cherington 1998G, executive Vice President and general manager of the Boston Red Sox
 Chick Davies 1914, pitcher and outfielder with the Philadelphia Athletics and New York Giants
 Gary DiSarcina 1995, MLB All-Star, California Angels
 Mike Flanagan 1975, 1979 Cy Young Award winner, Baltimore Orioles
 Nick Gorneault 2001, outfielder, Los Angeles Angels
 Bob Hansen, first baseman, Milwaukee Brewers
 Neal Huntington MA, General Manager of the Pittsburgh Pirates
 Dave Littlefield 1984, Senior Vice President and general manager of the Pittsburgh Pirates
 Chad Paronto, relief pitcher, Houston Astros
 Jeff Reardon 1977, relief pitcher Minnesota Twins, Montreal Expos, Boston Red Sox
 Mike Stone 1981, Vermont and UMass baseball coach
 Dave Telgheder, starting pitcher, New York Mets
 Ron Villone 1992, relief pitcher, St. Louis Cardinals

Basketball
 Tony Barbee 1993, collegiate basketball coach, Central Michigan University
 Bill Bayno (did not graduate), Division 1 collegiate coach and professional assistant coach
 Marcus Camby, 1996 Naismith College Player of the Year and retired professional basketball player
 Julius Erving 1972, Hall of Fame professional basketball player (received earned bachelor's and honorary doctorate simultaneously)
 Gary Forbes 2008, professional basketball player, Toronto Raptors
 Derek Kellogg 1995, collegiate basketball coach University of Massachusetts Amherst
 Stéphane Lasme 2007, professional basketball player, Miami Heat
 Rick Pitino 1974, professional and collegiate basketball coach
Raphiael Putney (born 1990), basketball player for Maccabi Haifa of the Israeli National League
 Lou Roe 1995, professional basketball player, Detroit Pistons and Golden State Warriors
 Al Skinner 1974, basketball coach, Boston College

Football
 Neal Brown, Texas Tech Red Raiders offensive coordinator
 Liam Coen 2008, offensive coordinator, Los Angeles Rams
 Victor Cruz 2010, professional football player and 2012 Super Bowl Champion, New York Giants; second-team All-Pro (2011) Pro Bowl (2012)
 Vladimir Ducasse, professional football player, Buffalo Bills
 Tom Gilson, American football player
 Chris Grier, general manager of the Miami Dolphins since 2016
 Jeremy Horne, professional football player, Kansas City Chiefs
 James Ihedigbo professional football player, Buffalo Bills
 Andy Isabella, wide receiver, Arizona Cardinals
 Greg Landry 1968, quarterback, Detroit Lions
 Brandon London 2006, professional football player, Miami Dolphins
 John McCormick 1961, professional football quarterback/punter, Minnesota Vikings, Denver Broncos
 Jeromy Miles, professional football player, Cincinnati Bengals
 Milt Morin 1966, tight end, All-Pro, Cleveland Browns
 Tajae Sharpe 2016, professional football player, Atlanta Falcons
 Marcel Shipp, running back, Arizona Cardinals (former team), 2009 UFL Champions Las Vegas Locomotives
 Mike Tannenbaum, former general manager of the New York Jets

Hockey
 David Branch, president of the Canadian Hockey League
 Justin Braun, professional ice hockey player, San Jose Sharks
 Matt Irwin, professional ice hockey player, Nashville Predators
 John Lyons, Olympic ice hockey player, 1924 Olympic silver medalist
 James Marcou, professional ice hockey player, San Jose Sharks
 Brad Norton 1998, professional ice hockey player
 Thomas Pock, professional ice hockey player, New York Islanders
 Jonathan Quick, professional ice hockey player; 2010 Olympic silver medalist; 2012 NHL All-Star; 2012 Conn Smythe winner; 2014 Stanley Cup Champion, Los Angeles Kings
 Conor Sheary, professional ice hockey player, 2016 Stanley Cup Champion, Pittsburgh Penguins
 Frank Vatrano, professional ice hockey player, Florida Panthers
 Casey Wellman, professional ice hockey player, Washington Capitals
 Cale Makar, professional ice hockey player, Colorado Avalanche

Lacrosse
 Sal LoCascio, retired professional lacrosse goaltender
 Doc Schneider, professional lacrosse player, Toronto Nationals

Other sports
 Gideon Ariel (born 1939), Israeli Olympic competitor in the shot put and discus throw
 Danielle Henderson 1999, Olympic gold medal winner, softball
 Roxanne Modafferi, professional mixed martial artist
 Chris Sanford, The Ultimate Fighter Season 1 contestant, retired professional MMA fighter
 Briana Scurry 1995, two-time Olympic gold medal winner and women's World Cup champion, soccer
 Serena Williams, tennis player, four-time Olympic Gold Medalist and 23-time Grand Slam winner

Others
 Julie Robenhymer, former Miss New Jersey

See also
 University of Massachusetts Amherst

References 

Alumni
University of Massachusetts Amherst alumni